Reidville is a village located north east of Deer Lake. A post office was established in 1967 and the first Postmisstress was Dorothy Barrett.

Demographics 

Insectarium
Reidville is home to the Newfoundland Insectarium and Butterfly Pavilion, which opened in 1998.

See also
List of cities and towns in Newfoundland and Labrador
 Deer Lake Airport
 For the airport in Newfoundland and Labrador, see Deer Lake Regional Airport.

References

External links

Reidville - Encyclopedia of Newfoundland and Labrador, vol. 4, p. 570.

Populated coastal places in Canada
Towns in Newfoundland and Labrador